Nessonas is a village and a former municipality in the Larissa regional unit, Thessaly, Greece. Since the 2011 local government reform it is part of the municipality Tempi, of which it is a municipal unit. Population 4,750 (2011). The municipal unit has an area of 172.675 km2. The seat of the municipality was in Sykourio.

References

Populated places in Larissa (regional unit)